Bar Island is a long, low, rocky islet lying  off the west end of Red Rock Ridge, Antarctic Peninsula. First roughly surveyed in 1936 by the British Graham Land Expedition (BGLE) under John Rymill. Resurveyed in 1948-49 by the Falkland Islands Dependencies Survey (FIDS), who so named the islet because of its shape.

See also 
 List of antarctic and sub-antarctic islands

Islands of Antarctica